Trifurcula eurema is a moth of the family Nepticulidae. It is widespread throughout Europe, northwards to southern Norway and Sweden (but not in Finland), Poland and the Baltic Region. It is also found in the Mediterranean region, including the larger Mediterranean islands, east to Bulgaria, Asiatic Turkey and Ukraine.

The wingspan is 4.5–7 mm.

The larvae feed on Dorycnium hirsutum, Dorycnium pentaphyllum, Dorycnium rectum, Lotus corniculatus, Lotus cytisoides, Lotus ornithopodoides, Lotus pedunculatus, Lotus uliginosus and Tetragonolobus maritimus. They mine the leaves of their host plant. The mine consists of a long narrow corridor with a linear frass line. The corridor abruptly widens into a blotch that may occupy almost an entire leaflet at the end. The blotch mostly starts at the base of the leaflet, where most frass is concentrated. Pupation normally takes place within the mine.

External links
Review Of The Subgenus Trifurcula (Levarchama), With Two New Species (Lepidoptera: Nepticulidae)
bladmineerders.nl
 Swedish Moths
 Figures of genitalia
lepiforum.de

Nepticulidae
Moths of Europe
Moths of Asia
Moths described in 1899